Ficus consociata is a banyan fig species in the family Moraceae.  No subspecies are listed in the Catalogue of Life.  The species can be found in Indo-China and western Malesia.  In Vietnam it  may be called đa đồng hành.

Its common name is Karet Binasah. It grows to a height of 25 meters and is pollinated by wasps.

Like Ficus elastica, it produces a latex that has been used in the production of rubber. However, it eventually fell out of favor for such a purpose, owing to the resin hardening with time.

References

External links 
 

consociata
Trees of Vietnam
Flora of Indo-China
Flora of Malesia